Kaalikaamba Kamatheshwara Temple is located in Nagarathpet in Bangalore city, Karnataka, India. The city is dedicated to the deities Kaalikaamba and Kamatheshwara (the Hindu god Shiva, and goddess Shakthi or parvathi). The temple is nearly 800 years old and  dates back to the Chola period.

Reference List 

14th-century Hindu temples
Chola architecture
Hindu temples in Bangalore